Archangels in Black is the fourth studio album by French progressive metal band Adagio. According to their website, the mastering of Archangels in Black was completed on 3 September 2008. After numerous delays, the album was officially released on 2 February 2009 in Europe. The band stated that "the compositions are the ultimate balance between melodic and extreme metal and can be considered as a more brutal version of Underworld". Archangels in Black is Adagio's first and only album to include Christian Palin on vocals, but the backing vocals were sung by Gustavo Monsanto, Adagio's former vocalist who sang on Dominate.

Pre-release and production 
The band entered the studio in October 2007, but they had to exit in order to do a tour. They re-entered the studio in December 2007.

On 13 October 2008, Adagio announced that the album would be released through the label Listenable Records.

On 24 October 2008, information about the album's artwork and its complete track listing was released. The cover artwork was done by Guilherme Sevens. The release date for Archangels in Black was also announced to be 2 February 2009.

A 3:58 video was released for "Fear Circus" in January 2009.

Track listing 
"Vamphyri" – 4:27
"The Astral Pathway" – 5:04
"Fear Circus" – 3:59
"Undead" – 4:41
"Archangels in Black" – 5:37
"The Fifth Ankh" – 4:43
"Codex Oscura" – 9:08
"Twilight at Dawn" – 6:24
"Getsu Senshi" – 3:42

Personnel 
 Stéphan Forté – guitars, vocals
 Franck Hermanny – bass
 Christian Palin – vocals
 Eric Lebailly – drums
 Kevin Codfert – keyboards

Charts

References 

2009 albums
Adagio (band) albums